Murghāb can refer to:

Murghab River, a river that rises in west-central Afghanistan and ends in Turkmenistan
Bartang River, a river that rises in the Wakhan District of northeastern Afghanistan and flows into Tajikistan, which is known as "Murghab River" in its upper reaches

See also
Murghab (disambiguation)